The 2014 Cheltenham Gold Cup (known as the Betfred Gold Cup for sponsorship reasons) was the 86th annual running of the Cheltenham Gold Cup horse race and was held at Cheltenham Racecourse on Friday 14 March 2014.

Build-Up
A total of 36 entries were received for the race with 2013 winner Bobs Worth the 2/1 favourite, and 2013 King George VI Chase winner Silviniaco Conti at 7/2 second favourite. 

The race was shown live on Channel 4 in the UK and Ireland.

Full result

* The distances between the horses are shown in lengths or shorter. shd = short-head.† Trainers are based in Great Britain unless indicated. PU = pulled-up. NR = non runner. UR = Unseated Rider.

Race
The race was won by 20/1 outsider Lord Windermere who won by a short head from On His Own after a stewards inquiry.
Stewards admitted that the runner-up, On His Own, had been impeded, but ruled it was minor interference that did not affect the result.

Result after stewards inquiry
 1. Lord Windermere: Jockey  (Davy Russell), Trainer (Jim Culloty)
 2. On His Own: Jockey (David Casey), Trainer  (Willie Mullins)

Details
 Sponsor: Betfred
 Winner's prize money: £327,325.82
 Going:Good
 Number of runners:13 
 Winner's time:6m 43.88s

See also
Horseracing in Great Britain
List of British National Hunt races
2014 Grand National

References

External links
2014 Cheltenham Gold Cup at the Racing Post

Cheltenham Gold Cup
 2014
Cheltenham Gold Cup
Cheltenham Gold Cup
2010s in Gloucestershire